Addington County was a historic county in  the Canadian province of Ontario which now forms part of Lennox and Addington County. It was named after Henry Addington, 1st Viscount Sidmouth.

Its territory is now distributed among the townships of Addington Highlands, Stone Mills, and Loyalist.

Historical evolution
The county of Addington, situated within the Mecklenburg District, was originally created as an electoral district for the Legislative Assembly of Upper Canada in 1792 and its original limits were described as being:

Mecklenburg was renamed as the "Midland District" in 1792.

It was combined with Lennox County and Amherst Island in 1800 to become  the incorporated counties of Lennox and Addington. The counties would regain their separate identities in 1845, but would continue to be united for electoral purposes. The newly surveyed township of Anglesea was added to Addington at that time. The township of Kaladar was also included, having been added to the incorporated counties in 1821.

At the beginning of 1850, Midland District was abolished, and the United Counties of Frontenac, Lennox and Addington replaced it for municipal and judicial purposes. In 1860, Lennox and Addington were formally amalgamated as the County of Lennox and Addington.

Historical townships
 Abinger Township - The township is now part of Addington Highlands.
 Amherst Island Township - The township is now part of Loyalist.
 Anglesea Township - The township is now part of Addington Highlands.
 Ashby Township - The township is now part of Addington Highlands.
 Camden Township - The township is now part of Stone Mills.
 Denbigh Township - The township is now part of Addington Highlands.
 Effingham Township - The township is now part of Addington Highlands.
 Ernestown Township - The township is now part of Loyalist.
 Kaladar Township - The township is now part of Addington Highlands.
 Sheffield Township - The township is now part of Stone Mils.

See also
 Census geographic units of Canada
 List of census divisions of Ontario
 List of townships in Ontario

Further reading
  Also

References

External links
County of Lennox and Addington in 1951

Former counties in Ontario
History of Lennox and Addington County
States and territories established in 1792